Greda can refer to several places in Bosnia and Herzegovina and Croatia:

In Bosnia and Herzegovina
Greda, Bosanska Gradiška, village in the Bosanska Gradiška municipality
Greda, Ljubuški, village in the Ljubuški municipality
Greda, Šipovo, village in the Šipovo municipality
Bukova Greda, village in the Orašje, Bosnia municipality

In Croatia
Greda, Sisak-Moslavina County, village in the Sisak municipality 
Greda, Varaždin County, village in the Maruševec municipality 
Greda, Zagreb County, village in the Vrbovec municipality 
Babina Greda, village and municipality in Vukovar-Srijem County
Blinjska Greda, village in Sunja municipality
Donja Greda, village in Rugvica municipality
Gabajeva Greda, village in Hlebine municipality
Gornja Greda, village in Brckovljani municipality
Greda Breška, village in Ivanić-Grad municipality
Greda Sunjska, village in Sunja municipality
Hrastova Greda, village in Kalinovac municipality
Molve Grede, village in Molve municipality
Sopjanska Greda, village in Sopje municipality
Visoka Greda, village in Vrbje municipality
Zlatna Greda, village in Bilje municipality